Wearing may refer to:

 Wearing (surname), a surname
 Wearing clothes, a feature of all modern human societies
 Wearing ship, a sailing maneuver

See also

 Wear (disambiguation)